Madame du Barry was a mistress of King Louis XV of France.

Madame du Barry may also refer to films about her life:

 Madame Du Barry (1917 film), starring Theda Bara
 Madame DuBarry (1919 film), a German production directed by Ernst Lubitsch and featuring Pola Negri
 Madame du Barry (1928 film), a 1928 MGM short silent film
 Madame Du Barry (1934 film), starring Delores del Rio
 Madame du Barry (1954 film), a French film

See also
 Madame du Barry#In popular culture, for other films